Sport by the Whole Wide World is an event in Taganrog, Russia to present annual awards to recognize people worldwide for their heroic and courageous deeds, saving lives in difficult situations.

History
The festival was established in 2012. The main stage is an open-air plaza on Pushkin Embankment and at the foot of Depaldo Stairs.

September 15, 2012 the organizers awarded the guests - heroes of salvation operations at Krymsk, at Costa Concordia disaster, in South Ossetia and distinguished policemen of Rostov Oblast.

Within the framework of the festival "Sport by the Whole Wide World. From the Bottom of the Heart" were awarded people who showed courage and heroism while rescuing passengers of the cruise ship Costa Concordia, which had more than 100 Russian tourists on board. They are: Deputy Mayor of Isola del Giglio Mario Pellegrini and Isola del Giglio's Port Official Giovanni Rossi.

The next upcoming festival is to be held in Taganrog on August 31, 2013.

Famous presenters of the awards
Among the famous presenters of the awards in 2012 were: Nikolai Valuev, Natascha Ragosina, Svetlana Zhurova, Riccardo Fogli, Sergei Trofimov, Uliana Donskova, Tatiana Gorbunova.

External links and references
 Official web site of the event

Awards established in 2012
Festivals in Russia